Shutispear Creek is a stream in the U.S. state of Mississippi.

Shutispear is a name derived from the Choctaw language purported to mean "pot scoop; ladle".

References

Rivers of Mississippi
Rivers of Calhoun County, Mississippi
Rivers of Webster County, Mississippi
Mississippi placenames of Native American origin